S. Lakshmanan   (born 1972) is the Tamil politician who belongs to Dravida Munnetra Kazhagam elected as a member of legislative assembly of bodinayakkanur constituency for the term (2006-2011).again  he contest in the assembly election for dmk at bodinayakkanur where he secured second position next to the O. Panneerselvam of All India Anna Dravida Munnetra Kazhagam.

References

External links
 http://www.nationsroot.com/members-lakshmanan-s

Dravida Munnetra Kazhagam politicians
1967 births
Living people